The  is a river in eastern Tottori Prefecture, Japan. The source of the river is in the Chūgoku Mountains. The Sendai flows north through Tottori Prefecture into the Sea of Japan. Under the Rivers Act of 1964 it is designated a Class 1 River, and is managed by the Japanese Ministry of Land, Infrastructure, Transport and Tourism. About 200,000 people live along the course of the river. The Sendai River provides sediment to form the Tottori Sand Dunes, the largest dune system in Japan.

Geography

Upper reaches

The source of the Sendai River is in the vicinity of Okinosen and Mount Nagi, deep in the Chūgoku Mountains on the border of Tottori and Okayama prefectures. Several tributaries of the Sendai similarly emerge from the Chūgoku Mountains in this area, and form a fan-shaped area before flowing into the main course of the Sendai River. The upper reaches of the Sendai and its tributaries is protected as part of Hyōnosen-Ushiroyama-Nagisan Quasi-National Park, established in 1969.

Middle reaches

In its middle reaches the Sendai River emerges from the Chūgoku Mountains and flows northward through the Tottori Plain. The microrelief of the Tottori Plain reveals that the Sendai once meandered across the plain, rather than following a straight course. Original construction on the Ōide Canal was carried out in 1600 by the feudal lord  (1557 – 1612) in order to open arable land in the region. The history of the construction of the Yamashirogawa Canal is unclear; the remaining earthworks suggest a history similar to that of the Ōide. The Ikeda clan, rulers of Tottori Castle throughout the Edo period, recorded significant work on the Fukuro River directly north of the canal, but left no written record of work on the Yamashirogawa.

Lower reaches

The mouth of the Sendai River is in the Karo district of the city of Tottori, where it empties into the Japan Sea. Sediment from the Sendai River at the Sea of Japan forms the Tottori Sand Dunes. The lowest reaches and the mouth of the Sendai River are protected as part of Sanin Kaigan National Park, and the Tottori Sand Dunes are designated a Natural Monument of Japan. Lake Koyama, a brackish lagoon to the west of the mouth of the Sendai River, was once an inlet of the Sea of Japan. Sediments from the Sendai blocked the mouth of the inlet over time, separating Lake Koyama from the Sea of Japan.

Jurisdictions

Tottori Prefecture
City of Tottori
Chizu

Tributaries

The tributaries of the Sendai River emerge from the Chūgoku Mountains and flow through low-lying valleys and tableland in the eastern reaches of Tottori Prefecture. Several tributaries are dammed to produce hydroelectric power. There are approximately 71 tributaries of the Sendai, and the major tributaries include:

Tottori Sand Dunes

The dunes were created by and are replenished by granitic deposits, specifically quartz, feldspar, lithic fragments, and amphibole. The sediments are carried from the Chūgoku Mountains down the river into the Sea of Japan. Fine sand from the sediments of the Sendai is carried back to the shore by currents and tides of the Sea of Japan, and then blown by wind to form the dunes. The Hamasaka sand dune has little vegetation and is considered the best-preserved dune of the system.

Environmental conditions

Illegal dumping of household garbage by residents on the Sendai River, notably on the Fukuro River tributary, is an ongoing environmental problems. Signs pointing out the illegality of dumping have been posted since 2009, and although there has been a reduction of dumping, the problem remains.

Environment

The areas near the mouth of the Sendai are noted for plant species which thrive in sandy areas, notably Calystegia soldanella, the beach morning glory. Stands of black pines are found in the same area. Miscanthus sacchariflorus, or Amur silver-grass, is found in the lower reaches of the Sendai where the river has a weaker current. Celtis jessoensis, the Japanese hackberry, and Aphananthe aspera, the Muku tree, are found along the lowest  of the river.

History

The Sendai River crossed historical Inaba Province, which made up the eastern half of present-day Tottori Prefecture. The river was used for transportation from early times, and as an inland water transportation link after the development of rice paddies on the middle reaches of the river. Rice was transported from the Tottori Plain south to the port at the mouth of the river. The Sendai River flowed near the jōkamachi (castle town) that emerged with the construction of Tottori Castle during the Sengoku period. The jōkamachi sat on low, damp ground, and suffered repeated damage due to flooding on the Sendai. In a 250-year period from the mid-18th century to the early 20th century, the Sendai flooded 100 times, roughly every three years. The urbanization of the city of Sendai caused even more frequent flooding.

Flood control works were carried out on the Sendai early in the 20th century. A major crook of the river above the mouth of the Sendai was straightened, and the river significantly widened, in 1930. The Fukuro River, a major tributary of the Sendai which meets the Sendai in Tottori City, had a new course excavated in 1934. The port at Tottori was heavily damaged by the Tottori earthquake of 1943 and a large fire in 1952. A plan to expand the Port of Tottori and straighten the lowest reaches of the river was made in this period. Construction of wharfs at the mouth of the river was completed in 1983. Typhoon Number 10 in 1998 caused a landslide behind a quarry along the Sendai. About 50,000 cubic meters of rock were dumped into the river.

Culture

The tradition of floating dolls on the river, or nagashibina, began along the shallow rapids of the middle part of the Sendai River. The tradition continues today and is designated an Intangible Cultural Asset of Tottori Prefecture. Inshū-gami, a type of washi, or Japanese paper, was produced on the Sendai River from the early Edo period (1603 – 1868), and its production was regulated by the Tokugawa shogunate. The paper is still produced in Chizu.

Transportation

Several roads and railroad lines follow the path of the Sendai River. The Chizu Line of the Chizu Express follows the river from Yamasato Station to Chizu Station. The JR West Inbi Line follows the Sendai from Chizu Station to Tottori Station. The Tottori Expressway follows the course of the river from its source to Tottori City. Japan National Route 53 and Japan National Route 373 follow the course of the Sendai in Chizu.

References

External links
Sendai River, Ministry of Land, Infrastructure, Transport and Tourism
千代川: ライブカメラ Live camera views of the Sendai River at five locations along the river. Japanese Ministry of Land, Infrastructure, Transport and Tourism.

Rivers of Tottori Prefecture
Rivers of Japan